Suite Caminos is a 2015 album by Gonzalo Rubalcaba. It earned Rubalcaba a Grammy Award nomination for Best Latin Jazz Album. The album contains "an eight-section recitative scored for alto saxophone (Will Vinson), tenor saxophone (Seamus Blake), trumpet (Alex Sipiagin), guitar (Adam Rogers), bass ([Matt] Brewer) and drums (Ernesto Simpson), a coro of Miami-based Yoruba practitioners, and [... Rubalcaba] on piano, synths and organ."

Track list

Personnel
Seamus Blake - tenor sax
Matt Brewer - upright bass
Sonyalsi “Sonia” Feldman - vocals (tracks 4, 5), chorus
Mario Hidalgo - vocals (track 1)
Pedrito Martinez - vocals (tracks 2, 3, 7, 8), chorus, percussion
John McLaughlin - electric guitar (track 6)
Adam Rogers - guitars
Gonzalo Rubalcaba - piano, synths, palmadas, tambor
Ernesto Simpson - drums
Alex Sipiagin - trumpet, flugelhorn
Will Vinson - alto sax, soprano sax

References

2015 albums
Gonzalo Rubalcaba albums